= Mazuba Haanyama =

- Born: South Africa
- Citizenship: South African
- Occupations: Writer; Policy expert; Activist
- Employer: Meta
- Known for: Human rights advocacy; women's and LGBT rights
- Title: Head of Human Rights and Public Policy (Africa, Middle East & Turkey)

Mazuba Haanyama is a South African writer and policy expert who serves as head of Meta's human rights and public policy division for Africa, the Middle East and Turkey. She is also known for her advocacy on women's rights and LGBT rights across Africa.

== Career ==
Haanyama has been involved in initiatives promoting digital skills and employment opportunities for young people in Africa, including work related to Google's Digify Africa campaign. Her work focuses on digital policy, online safety, and access to technology.

== Advocacy and public engagement ==
She has contributed to discussions on identity, gender, and representation, including writing on cultural issues affecting women. Her work has also been referenced in broader debates on content moderation and digital platforms.
